Raw Story (also stylized as RawStory) is an American progressive news website. It was founded in 2004 by John K. Byrne and is owned by Byrne and Michael Rogers.

History 
Byrne, the former editor-in-chief of The Oberlin Review, founded Raw Story after he graduated from Oberlin College in 2003. It was officially launched in 2004, with Rogers joining the same year.

In 2017, Raw Story was accepted as a member of the Association of Alternative News Media.

In April 2018, Raw Story partners John K. Byrne and Michael Rogers announced that they had acquired AlterNet via a newly created company, AlterNet Media, as well as the New Civil Rights Movement.

From 2019 to 2021, Raw Story partnered with Pulitzer Prize winner investigative journalist David Cay Johnston and his nonprofit news service DCReport, providing funding for DCReport's investigative reporting in exchange for original content for Raw Story's subscribers on financial regulation, taxes, energy, the environment, worker safety and corruption.

In 2023, Raw Story hired Dave Levinthal as Editor-in-Chief and Adam Nichols as Executive Editor with the goal of expanding investigative and enterprise reporting. Levinthal was deputy editor at Insider, and previously served at OpenSecrets, Politico and The Dallas Morning News. Adam Nichols was formerly Managing Editor at Patch.

Content 

Founder John Byrne described Raw Story as "focusing on news that's downplayed by mainstream media outlets". In 2014, then-executive editor Tony Ortega described Raw Story's editorial mission as trying to expose people "who try to exploit American ideas about fair play and equality by rigging things through their immense wealth or their discriminatory cultural myopia." In 2005, Newsweek described rawstory.com as: "Muck, raked: If you're looking for alleged GOP malfeasance, the folks at rawstory.com are frequently scooping the mainstream media."

In November 2008, Raw Story reported that the United Mine Workers of America, which had endorsed Barack Obama's presidential campaign, had come to Obama's defense after John McCain's presidential campaign criticized him for a comment he had made about coal to the editorial board of the San Francisco Chronicle earlier that January. Environmental journalist Andrew Revkin cited the article by Raw Story in a post he wrote for The New York Times' Dot Earth blog, and Curtis Brainard, writing in the Columbia Journalism Review, described the article as "well-done".

In 2011, Raw Story was among the first outlets to report on the Apple assistant Siri apparently directing users away from abortion clinics and emergency contraception, instead providing results for the definition of emergency contraception or clinics far from the user. The assistant, still in beta testing at the time, could, however, provide users with methods to acquire Viagra or use escort services.

The same year, Raw Story was the first to report on a United States Air Force contract to create fake social media profiles as a means of psychological warfare to be used against terrorist cells.

In 2012, then-executive editor Megan Carpentier wrote about undergoing a transvaginal ultrasound procedure in response to recent legislation in Virginia requiring an ultrasound prior to an abortion procedure.

In 2014, Jennifer Mascia published a column on gun violence after compiling records for The New York Times.

The same year, the outlet broke news of the connection between San Diego State University running back Adam Muema and Raymond "Lord Rayel" Howard-Lear. Howard-Lear claimed to be a prophet and made apocalyptic predictions online. Muema left the 2014 NFL Scouting Combine early and did not attend the San Diego State Pro Day while sending cryptic messages to reporters.

In 2017, Raw Story investigative reporter Jordan Green reported from the ground of the Unite the Right rally, and in 2021 covered the civil trial which resulted in a $25 million judgment against the organizers of the rally. Green had been following the activities of extremist groups, learning their lingo, and communicating with them. He has learned that such groups precisely and strategically plan their violent clashes. "That revelation informs his new work — tracking where January 6th insurrectionists’ anger is now directed and how it may manifest again."

On February 15, 2021, Raw Story reported that South Dakota Governor Kristi Noem had used a state airplane to travel to conservative political events. The report led Democratic lawmakers to formally request that the state's attorney general investigate Noem.

The outlet has also reported on far-right extremists, including a report on January 6, 2021, hours before the attack in the U.S. Capitol that "predicted exactly what would happen," according to Editor & Publisher. Raw Story was among the first to report on instigators of the riots, including an alleged attempt by the Oath Keepers to get then-President Trump to declare martial law using the Insurrection Act.

In 2023, Raw Story was the first outlet to report on the re-indictments of the founders of the Rise Above Movement, a California white nationalist group known for actively seeking out and engaging in street brawls.

In 2023, Raw Story's Dave Levinthal was the first to report that cyberthieves stole $690,000 from the campaign of Senator Jerry Moran, and revealed that $150,000 was stolen from the campaign of Rep. Troy Nehls.

False claims 

In December 2017, Raw Story published an article based on a CNN report which mistakenly stated that on September 4, 2016, Donald Trump Jr. had received a website and a decryption key to preview the emails from the 2016 Democratic National Committee email leak before they were made public by WikiLeaks; the date was later corrected by CNN to September 14, 2016, which was after the emails had been reported on publicly. Raw Story did not include the correction in its article.

On February 19, 2018, Raw Story published a report claiming that Russian trolls co-opting the Me Too movement had forced Minnesota senator Al Franken to resign, and that an article by writer Ijeoma Oluo had been used as part of the campaign. Oluo told Snopes that her article had been published after Franken announced his resignation, adding: "I was hoping that the piece would give people context and help people grow from all of this into a better place." Raw Story later retracted its report.

During the 2020 United States presidential election, Raw Story published an article on November 4, 2020, which claimed that the United States Postal Service (USPS) had failed to deliver 27% of mail-in ballots in South Florida. PolitiFact determined that the figure was based on a misreading of Postal Service data, and the USPS stated that it had skipped some steps to get ballots to election offices faster.

Reception

Major media outlets have called Raw Story an investigative news site, progressive, left-leaning, independent, and an alternative news site. Raw Story has performed exclusive interviews, investigative reporting, and has broken many stories. Raw Story articles have been recognized by Columbia Journalism Review and the Associated Press, and been mentioned by other news agencies such as Reuters.

On August 4, 2008, the Online News Association announced that Raw Story was a finalist in the 2008 Online Journalism Awards in the "Investigative, Small Site" category for the article "The permanent Republican majority", which was about improper partisan influence in the prosecution of former Governor Don Siegelman of Alabama.

An August 2017 study by the Berkman Klein Center for Internet & Society found that between May 1, 2015, and November 7, 2016, Raw Story was the fourth and fifth most popular left-wing news source on Twitter and Facebook, respectively. The study also found that Raw Story was the 9th most shared media source on Twitter by Hillary Clinton supporters during the 2016 United States presidential election. Another study found that rawstory.com also featured prominently on the list of links shared by a Russian troll farm via Twitter.

In 2021, a Raw Story report by Daniel Newhauser broke the story on South Dakota Governor Kristi Noem's use of the state airplane for non-official purposes, which resulted in criminal investigations. The investigative reporting was a finalist for a 2022 Society of Professional Journalists award which "honors a journalist or news organization for outstanding use of public records in reporting or advocacy of rights such as press freedom and public access."

In 2022, Raw Story won the first place EPPY Award in the category "Best news/political blog (1 million or more unique visitors)" for its opinion piece by Dakota Adams, son of Oath Keepers' founder Stewart Rhodes, titled "How I left the far right". The article described how Adams became disillusioned with the anti-government militia group in the later days of the Trump administration.

In 2009, libertarian journalist Michael Moynihan referred to Raw Story as a "conspiracy-friendly" website. In 2016, ad verification company DoubleVerify, which helps advertisers select which types of websites their automated online ads might appear on, created a new category called "Inflammatory Politics & News", one of 75 categories. The new category was to include "hardcore conservative and liberal sites", and included rawstory.com as well as several far-right websites. A 2018 report by the Oxford Internet Institute categorized Raw Story as one of the "Top 30 Junk News Sources on Twitter." Some consider Raw Story a hyperpartisan media outlet.

Staff
As of January 2023, Roxanne Cooper was publisher and Dave Levinthal was editor-in-chief. Editorial staff are members of the Washington-Baltimore Newspaper Guild. Notable former editorial staff include former Village Voice executive editor Tony Ortega.

References

External links

American news websites
American political websites
Internet properties established in 2004
American political blogs
Progressivism in the United States
Left-wing politics in the United States
Tabloid journalism